Alex Watson may refer to:

Alex Watson (footballer) (born 1968), English Association football (soccer) player
Alex Watson (football manager), English Association football (soccer) manager
Alex Watson (pentathlete) (born 1957), Australian modern pentathlete
Alex Watson (rugby league) (1931–2002), Australian rugby league footballer

See also
Alexander Watson (disambiguation)